Serbia and Montenegro competed at the 2004 Summer Olympics in Athens, Greece, from 13 to 29 August 2004. Previously known as the Federal Republic of Yugoslavia, this was the nation's third and last joint appearance at the Summer Olympics before Serbia and Montenegro became separated independent states in 2006. The Olympic Committee of Serbia and Montenegro sent a total of 85 athletes to the Games, 78 men and 7 women, to compete in 14 sports. Men's basketball, football, volleyball, and water polo were the only team-based sports in which Serbia and Montenegro had its representation at these Games. There was only a single competitor in road cycling, judo, tennis, and wrestling.

The Serbia and Montenegro team featured several Olympic medalists from Sydney, including the reigning men's volleyball champions (led by team captain Vladimir Grbić), and pistol shooter Jasna Šekarić, who became the first Serbian athlete to compete in five Olympic Games under three different banners (the other were SFR Yugoslavia and Independent Olympic Participants). Meanwhile, four Serbia and Montenegro athletes had made their fourth Olympic appearance: high jumper Dragutin Topić, shot putter Dragan Perić (the oldest of the team at age 40), rifle shooter Stevan Pletikosić, and table tennis player Slobodan Grujić. Basketball team captain Dejan Bodiroga was appointed by the committee to become the nation's flag bearer in the opening ceremony.

Serbia and Montenegro ended its last Olympic journey as a joint nation in Athens with two Olympic silver medals from Sekaric and the men's water polo team (led by Viktor Jelenić).
These would be the last Summer Games in which athletes from Montenegro and Serbia participated as Yugoslavia as they both competed separately in the 2008 Olympics

Medalists

Athletics

Serbia and Montenegrin athletes have so far achieved qualifying standards in the following athletics events (up to a maximum of 3 athletes in each event at the 'A' Standard, and 1 at the 'B' Standard).

Men
Track & road events

Field events

Women
Track & road events

Field events

Basketball

Men's tournament

Roster

Group play

Classification match (11th–12th place)

Canoeing

Sprint

Qualification Legend: Q = Qualify to final; q = Qualify to semifinal

Cycling

Road

Football

Men's tournament

Roster

Group play

Judo

Serbia and Montenegro has qualified a single judoka.

Rowing

Serbia and Montenegrin rowers qualified the following boats:

Men

Qualification Legend: FA=Final A (medal); FB=Final B (non-medal); FC=Final C (non-medal); FD=Final D (non-medal); FE=Final E (non-medal); FF=Final F (non-medal); SA/B=Semifinals A/B; SC/D=Semifinals C/D; SE/F=Semifinals E/F; R=Repechage

Shooting

Three Serbia and Montenegrin shooters (two men and one woman) qualified to compete in the following events:

Men

Women

Swimming 

Serbia and Montenegrin swimmers earned qualifying standards in the following events (up to a maximum of 2 swimmers in each event at the A-standard time, and 1 at the B-standard time):

Men

Women

Table tennis

Three Serbia and Montenegrin table tennis players qualified for the following events.

Tennis

Serbia nominated a female tennis player to compete in the tournament.

Volleyball

Men's tournament

Roster

Group play

Quarterfinals

Water polo

Men's tournament

Roster

Group play

Quarterfinals

Semifinals

Gold medal final

 Won silver medal

Wrestling 

Men's Greco-Roman

See also
 Serbia and Montenegro at the 2004 Summer Paralympics

References

External links
Official Report of the XXVIII Olympiad
Olympic Committee of Serbia 

Nations at the 2004 Summer Olympics
2004
Olympics